Squamura acutistriata is a moth in the family Cossidae. It is found on Java and possibly Borneo.

References

Natural History Museum Lepidoptera generic names catalog

Metarbelinae
Fauna of Java
Moths described in 1923